When the Moon Turns to Blood: Lori Vallow, Chad Daybell, and a Story of Murder, Wild Faith, and End Times is a book written by Leah Sottile and published by Twelve Books.

Background 
The title comes from the Book of Revelations during which the moon is prophesied to turn red like blood. The book discusses the Killings of Tylee Ryan and J. J. Vallow. Sottile focuses on the parents' extremist Mormon beliefs. They were particularly fond of apocolyptic literature. The parents were arrested in Hawaii after their children were found dead in their backyard in Idaho.

Reception 
John Dehlin, of the Mormon Stories Podcast, called it "a critical book for understanding 21st century Mormonism," and Courtney Eathorne wrote in Booklist that the book is an "exquisitely researched history of LDS and its fringe offshoots." Ron Sylvester wrote in the Spokesman-Review that “Sottile uses the story, unthinkable to most parents, that a mom would participate in the killing of her own children, to weave together an unhealthy obsession, shared by a large swath of Americans that poisons both Christianity and conservative politics.” The Publishers Weekly review says that Sottile's "attempts to impose broader significance will fall flat for many”.

References

External links 
 
 Book excerpt

2022 non-fiction books
English-language books
Books about religion
Twelve (publisher) books